Three Hours is a 1927 American drama film based on the 1926 story Purple and Fine Linen by May Edginton. It was directed by James Flood and stars Corinne Griffith, who also served as executive producer.

The plot concerns a woman, Madeline Durkin (Griffith), who has lost all her wealth as well as her young daughter. Taking advantage of a stranger's kindness, she is apprehended for theft but asks for three hours leave to see her dying child.

Filmed in Los Angeles, the story is set in San Francisco. Nine years later, Edginton's story also provided the inspiration for the film Adventure in Manhattan. According to the website Silentera.com, a print of Three Hours survives at the George Eastman House in Rochester, New York.

Cast

References

External links
 
 
 Silent Film Still Archive
 Silents Are Golden - Corinne Griffith

1927 films
American black-and-white films
American silent feature films
1927 drama films
Films set in San Francisco
First National Pictures films
Films directed by James Flood
Silent American drama films
1920s English-language films
1920s American films